Sampson Nanton (born 22 February 1977) is a journalist and television news presenter in Trinidad and Tobago. He is currently the Executive Producer, CNC3 Television.

Career history
Nanton has 22 years' experience in print and broadcast journalism. He began his career in journalism in 1996 as a business reporter with the Daily Newsday in Trinidad and relocated to Tobago In July 2001 where he served as head of operations at the Daily Newsdays Tobago Bureau. For seven years he reported in the fields of politics, health and education while at the Newsday. In April 2003 Nanton joined Caribbean Communications Network TV6 in Trinidad as a senior reporter. He left CCN TV6 in August 2005 to become a founding member of Cable News Channel 3. He served as Assignment Editor with the station until his resignation in September 2006. In February 2007 he rejoined Cable News Channel 3 as a Producer of The Early Morning Show before moving on to the position of Senior News Producer. In April 2009, he became an anchor on CNC3 Television's flagship 7pm newscast. In November 2010, Nanton was appointed Deputy Head of News of CNC3 Television. In May 2013, Nanton was promoted to Executive Producer CNC3 Television. In addition to his other portfolios, he also holds the position of Assignment Editor at CNC3 Television. On Friday, 16 August 2013, Nanton announced that he was stepping down as a news anchor to give full focus to his new portfolio as Executive Producer.

Career highlights
Nanton has served as a panelist on media affairs on several occasions and has participated in dozens of seminars and fellowships on journalism across the Caribbean and the United States, with CNN, the Thomson Reuters Foundation, the International Press Institute, the Commonwealth Broadcasting Association, the Caribbean Media Corporation and the British Broadcasting Corporation.
He has worked as a freelance reporter for the Starbroek News of Guyana, the Tobago News, the Trinidad Express, the Economic Times Magazine for Latin America and the Caribbean, the Trinidad and Tobago Airports Authority Yearbook, the Point Magazine, and the Caribbean Trakker magazine.
Nanton was a columnist focusing on youth affairs with the Tobago News between 2001 and 2003.
He has covered news stories across the Caribbean, in Great Britain, in West Africa and in the United States. Stories covered included the historic visit of US President Barack Obama and Secretary of State Hillary Clinton as well as 34 hemispheric leaders to the Fifth Summit of the Americas in April 2009, US Vice President Joe Biden on a state visit in May 2013, a State Banquet for Her Majesty Queen Elizabeth II and His Royal Highness Prince Philip, Duke of Edinburgh, the historic visit to Trinidad and Tobago by Nelson Mandela in 2004, the state visit of Prince Charles of Wales and his wife Camilla, Duchess of Cornwall in 2008, the state visit of King Juan Carlos and Queen Sophia of Spain in 2009, the state visit of China's President Xi Jinping in May 2013, the state visit of Cuban President Raul Castro in 2011, a state visit by Prince Edward, Earl of Wessex and his wife Sophie, Countess of Wessex, the fall of US billionaire Sir Allen Stanford in Antigua in February 2009 and interviews and conferences involving former and current United Nations Secretaries General Kofi Annan and Ban Ki Moon, US Attorney General Eric Holder, former US Secretaries of State Madeleine Albright and Colin Powell, former British Prime Minister Gordon Brown, Canadian Prime Minister Stephen Harper, former French President Nicolas Sarkozy, India's Prime Minister Manmohan Singh, South Africa's President Jacob Zuma, former Australian President Kevin Rudd, former Denmark Prime Minister Lars Lokke Rasmussen, Bolivian President Evo Morales, former Brazilian President Luiz Inácio Lula da Silva, Argentina's President Cristina Fernández de Kirchner, deceased Venezuelan President Hugo Chávez, former wife of Nelson Mandela, Winnie Mandela, World Cricket Record Holder Brian Lara, entertainers Rihanna, Kanye West and John Legend and actress Gabrielle Union.
 In May 2012, he was the only journalist to conduct a one-on-one interview with Canada's Governor General David Johnston during an official visit to Trinidad and Tobago.
 In November 2009, he anchored the arrival of Queen's Elizabeth II to Trinidad and Tobago and the opening of the Commonwealth Heads of Government Conference in Port-of-Spain for CNC3 Television.
In January 2010, Nanton traveled to Haiti for five days to report on a 7.0 earthquake that devastated Port-au-Prince and claimed 230,000 lives. He returned to Haiti in February 2010 for six days, for follow-up coverage on the one-month mensiversary of the earthquake. Nanton also reported on the devastation of Grenada following Hurricane Ivan in 2004, on the aftermath of 9/11 in New York City in December 2001 and on the Gambian culture and traditions in 2000, including interviews with descendants of famed African slave, Kunta Kinte. He also covered the FIFA Under-17 World Cup in 2001 and the Commonwealth Heads of Government Meeting in 2009.
 He has covered ten general, local and assembly elections in Trinidad and Tobago and the swearing-in ceremonies for Presidents, Prime Ministers and Chief Secretaries.
Nanton was a Trinidad and Tobago Youth Ambassador to The Gambia in 2000 and was granted Honorary Citizenship to, and the Certificate of Futampaf (Boukout) of the West African country, following the Jola rite of passage. He also served as a Trinidad and Tobago Youth Ambassador to St Kitts and Nevis in 2002 and was the feature speaker at the UNESCO Caribbean Youth Gathering for Peace.
Nanton hosted the second and third annual Tobago House of Assembly Youth Excellence Awards in 2004 and 2005.
 On May 25, 1999, Nanton and a news photographer were arrested while covering a protest for the Trinidad and Tobago Newsday, one day before the Miss Universe Pageant being held in Trinidad and Tobago. He was charged with police obstruction and resisting arrest but won the matters in court. The arrest and subsequent court matters were documented by international media watchdog, Committee to Protect Journalists, in its 2000 compilation of attacks on the media.

Awards and honours
Hilton General Manager's Award for Excellence in Journalism - 2010 - Best Television News Story/Feature, Social & Community Development, "Haiti in Ruins"
Camsel/MATT Lumen Award - Best Television Feature, "Haiti in Ruins" - 2009/2010
Camsel/MATT Lumen Award - Best Supporting Video, "Haiti in Ruins" - 2009/2010
Hilton General Manager's Award for Excellence in Journalism - 2009 - Best Television News Story/Feature, Environment, "Turtles of Grande Reviere"
Journalist of the Year, CNC3 - 2009
Journalist of the Year, CNC3 - 2005

External links

 "Attacks on the Press 1999: Trinidad and Tobago", Committee to Protest Journalists, 22 March 2000
http://www.nalis.gov.tt/Biography/JoannaGeorge.htm
http://guardian.co.tt/news/general/2010/06/13/guardian-group-sweeps-annual-camsel-awards
http://www.rcpos.org/communications/lumen-media-awards/519-2009-2010-qtowards-a-culture-of-respect-dialogue-a-friendshipq.html
http://www.latinpetroleum.com/new/printarticle.php?aid=3487

Living people
1977 births
Trinidad and Tobago television personalities
Place of birth missing (living people)